is a railway station on the Hohi Main Line operated by JR Kyushu in Aso, Kumamoto, Japan.

Lines

Layout 
The station consists of two side platforms serving two tracks at grade. There is no station building and only platform 1 has a shelter for passengers. Access to the opposite side platform is by means of a level crossing. A bike shed is provided at the station forecourt.

A marker at the station announces that, at an altitude of 754 metres, Namino is the highest station in Kyushu.

Adjacent stations

History
The track was extended westwards in phases, with  being established as its western terminus  on 30 November 1925. This track was also extended in phases, reaching  as its eastern terminus on 25 January 1918. On 2 December 1928, Miyaji and Tamarai were linked up, with Namino opening on the same day as one of several intermediate stations along the new track. Through-traffic was established between Kumamoto and Ōita. The Inukai and Miyaji lines were merged and the entire stretch redesignated as the Hōhi Main Line. With the privatization of Japanese National Railways (JNR), the successor of JGR, on 1 April 1987, Namino came under the control of JR Kyushu.

On 17 September 2017, Typhoon Talim (Typhoon 18) damaged the Hōhi Main Line at several locations. Services between Aso and Nakahanda, including Namino, were suspended and replaced by bus services. Rail service from Aso through this station to Miemachi was restored by 22 September 2017 Normal rail services between Aso and Ōita were restored by 2 October 2017.

See also
List of railway stations in Japan

References

External links
Namino (JR Kyushu)

Railway stations in Kumamoto Prefecture
Railway stations in Japan opened in 1928